Temple Records is a record label founded in 1978 by Robin Morton, previously a member of The Boys of the Lough. 

It is located in Temple, Midlothian. Although Morton is from Ulster, the label is devoted almost purely to acoustic Scottish traditional music.

Morton worked as a producer for Topic Records. This label was not interested in recording the clarsach player Alison Kinnaird, as they did not think the record would sell. He formed Temple Records to release her first LP, The Harp Key (1978), which became a best selling traditional music record. Morton later married Kinnaird.

One of the earliest signings was The Battlefield Band, who rapidly rose to international fame. Morton became their manager in 1980. All their albums are on the Temple label. The success of the Battlefield Band in America prompted Morton to set up Temple US Records in the mid-1980s. As well as recordings by current folk artists, the label has released historic recordings by James Scott Skinner.

The Scottish Gaelic "supergroup" Mac-Talla, formed in 1992 at Morton's suggestion, was composed wholly of the label's artists.

See also
 List of record labels

References

External links 

British record labels
Record labels established in 1978
1978 establishments in Scotland
Companies based in Midlothian